ChilOut (Children Out of Detention) is a group opposed to the mandatory detention of children under 18 in immigration detention centres in Australia. The group was formed in 2001, in the context of the policies of the Howard government regarding asylum seekers in Australia.

The group was inspired by program on ABC Television showed an Iranian child called Shayan Badraie in immigration detention suffering post traumatic stress disorder.

A refugee advocate describes her response when she first saw the boy: "At first I believed he was a fake boy; a child made to look like a boy, a fundraiser for famine in Africa." (Acting from the Heart, Sarah Mares and Louise Newman (eds), p 6).

ChilOut's aim was to change the Migration Act 1958, to release all children and their families from mandatory and indefinite immigration detention. It did this mainly by petitioning media and politicians.

In 2005, ChilOut won the Community (Organisation) Award at the 2005 Human Rights Awards.

At its zenith it had over 4,000 members. Most children in immigration detention in Australia have been released (as at July 2005). At that time the Migration Act 1968 was amended to effectively say that children should only be detained as a last resort.

The group dissolved itself upon the election of the Labor government in 2007 under the mistaken belief that the ALP would be more progressive on refugee rights than the Howard government. The group reformed in 2011 when they realised that this was not the case.
ChilOut made a submission to the Australian Human Rights Commission's National Inquiry into Children in Immigration Detention in 2014.

According to the Department of Immigration there were 1731 children in locked detention in Australia as at August 2013.

See also

Amnesty International
Convention on the Rights of the Child
HREOC
Mandatory detention in Australia

References

External links
 ChilOut
 HREOC Children in Detention Report
 Migration Act 1958 (Cth)
 Duty of care to people in detention

2001 establishments in Australia
Children's rights organizations
Political organisations based in Australia
Child-related organisations in Australia